Jordan Maliek Bowden (born January 20, 1997) is an American professional basketball player for the Long Island Nets of the NBA G League. He played college basketball for the Tennessee Volunteers.

High school career
Bowden played high school basketball for Carter High School in Strawberry Plains, Tennessee and was coached by Joby Boydstone. As a senior he averaged 26.6 points, 8.9 rebounds and 4.2 assists per game, shooting 55 percent from the field. Bowden earned All-State and District 3-AA MVP recognition, and was named the Knoxville News Sentinel’s 2015 PrepXtra Boys Basketball Player of the Year. Bowden transferred to 22 Feet Academy for a season of prep basketball and drew major-college attention after scoring 30 points at the Tarkanian Classic in December of 2015. He averaged  17 points, 6.8 rebounds, and 4.2 assists per game. Ranked the No. 186 prospect in his class by 247Sports, Bowden signed with Tennessee on March 22, 2016, choosing the Volunteers over offers from Providence, Cincinnati, Marquette, and Utah.

College career
Bowden averaged  7.9 points and 2.9 rebounds per game as a freshman. He increased his scoring 9.1 points and rebounding to 3.6 rebounds per game as a sophomore. Bowden scored in double figures in 15 games as a sophomore. He was Tennessee’s fifth-leading scorer as a junior with 10.6 points per game and was second on the team in three-point shots made with 51. Bowden drew attention on social media with his dance breaks. He scored a season-high 26 points against Murray State in a 82–63 victory, then scored 18 points the following game in a 75–62 win over Washington. For these performances Bowden was named SEC Player of the Week on November 18, 2019. He had 16 points in a win over Alabama State on November 20 and surpassed the 1,000 point threshold. On February 22, 2020, Bowden scored a career-high 28 points and had six assists in a 73–66 loss to Auburn. As a senior, Bowden averaged 13.7 points, 4.0 rebounds, and 2.7 assists per game.

Professional career

Long Island Nets (2021–present)
After going undrafted in the 2020 NBA draft, Bowden signed an Exhibit 10 contract with the Brooklyn Nets on December 1, 2020. He was waived by the Nets on December 11. He was then added to the roster of the Nets' NBA G League affiliate, the Long Island Nets. He made his debut for the team in their season opener on February 10, 2021; scoring 4 points and grabbing 1 rebound in 8 minutes of action. On March 5, Bowden scored 20 points and had 11 rebounds in a win against the Memphis Hustle.

On October 11, 2021, Bowden signed with the Brooklyn Nets, but was waived at the end of training camp on October 15. On October 25, 2021, Bowden was included in the training camp roster of the Long Island Nets.

Career statistics

College

|-
| style="text-align:left;"|2016–17
| style="text-align:left;"|Tennessee
| 30 || 27 || 22.8 || .371 || .315 || .841 || 2.9 || 1.3 || .9 || .2 || 7.9
|-
| style="text-align:left;"|2017–18
| style="text-align:left;"|Tennessee
| 35 || 35 || 27.9 || .394 || .395 || .737 || 3.6 || 1.9 || 1.1 || .3 || 9.1
|-
| style="text-align:left;"|2018–19
| style="text-align:left;"|Tennessee
| 36 || 5 || 27.8 || .459 || .378 || .817 || 3.5 || 1.9 || .9 || .3 || 10.6
|-
| style="text-align:left;"|2019–20
| style="text-align:left;"|Tennessee
| 31 || 31 || 34.4 || .383 || .287 || .822 || 4.0 || 2.7 || 1.0 || .3 || 13.7
|- class="sortbottom"
| style="text-align:center;" colspan="2"|Career
| 132 || 98 || 28.3 || .403 || .341 || .802 || 3.5 || 2.0 || 1.0 || .3 || 10.3

References

External links
 Tennessee Volunteers bio

1997 births
Living people
American men's basketball players
Basketball players from Knoxville, Tennessee
Long Island Nets players
Shooting guards
Tennessee Volunteers basketball players